Patrick Walter "Piet" Biesiadecki (March 9, 1920 – November 26, 2000) was an American bobsledder who competed in the 1950s. He won a gold medal in the four-man event at the 1953 FIBT World Championships in Garmisch-Partenkirchen.

Biesiadecki also finished fifth in the two-man event at the 1956 Winter Olympics in Cortina d'Ampezzo.

Born and raised in Ware, Massachusetts, Biesiadecki was a career United States Army soldier who served during World War II, the Korean War and the Vietnam War and retired from active duty as a sergeant first class. After his death, he was buried at Fort Sam Houston National Cemetery.

References

Bobsleigh four-man world championship medalists since 1930
Wallechinsky, David. (1984). "Bobsled: Two-man". In The Complete Book of the Olympics: 1896-1980. New York: Penguin Books. p. 558.

1920 births
2000 deaths
People from Ware, Massachusetts
United States Army non-commissioned officers
Military personnel from Massachusetts
United States Army personnel of World War II
United States Army personnel of the Korean War
American male bobsledders
Bobsledders at the 1956 Winter Olympics
Olympic bobsledders of the United States
United States Army personnel of the Vietnam War
Burials at Fort Sam Houston National Cemetery